The Liberal–National Coalition, commonly known simply as the Coalition or the LNP, is an alliance of centre-right political parties that forms one of the two major groupings in Australian federal politics. The two partners in the Coalition are the Liberal Party of Australia and the National Party of Australia (the latter previously known as the Country Party and the National Country Party). Its main opponent is the Australian Labor Party (ALP); the two forces are often regarded as operating in a two-party system. The Coalition was last in government from the 2013 federal election until the 2022 Australian federal election. The group is led by Peter Dutton, who succeeded Scott Morrison after the 2022 Australian federal election.

The two parties in the Coalition have different voter bases, with the Liberals – the larger party – drawing most of their vote from urban areas and the Nationals operating almost exclusively in rural and regional areas. They occupy a broadly similar place on the right of the political spectrum. The partnership between the two current parties dates back to 1946, shortly after the Liberal Party was formed, and has continued almost uninterrupted since then. The Country Party also maintained similar alliances with the Liberal Party's predecessors, the United Australia Party and Nationalist Party, and similar parties at state level. The first such federal arrangement was formed in 1923, as a solution to the hung parliament that resulted from the 1922 federal election.

The Liberals and Nationals maintain separate organisational wings and separate parliamentary parties, but co-operate in various ways determined by a mixture of formal agreements and informal conventions. There is a single Coalition frontbench, both in government and in opposition, with each party receiving a proportionate number of positions. By convention, the leader of the Liberal Party serves as the overall leader, serving as prime minister when the Coalition is in government and leader of the opposition when the Coalition is in opposition. The leader of the National Party becomes the deputy prime minister during periods of conservative government. The two parties co-operate on their federal election campaigns, run joint Senate tickets in most states, and generally avoid running candidates against each other in the House of Representatives.

A merger of the Liberals and Nationals has been suggested on a number of occasions, but has never become a serious proposition. The relationship between the two parties varies at state and territory level. The situation in New South Wales and Victoria broadly mirrors that at federal level, while in Western Australia the parties are much more independent of each other. In the Northern Territory the territorial parties merged in 1974 to form the Country Liberal Party (CLP), and in 2008 the Queensland state-level parties merged, forming the Liberal National Party of Queensland (LNP). LNP and CLP members elected to federal parliament do not form separate parliamentary parties, joining either the Liberals or Nationals. In South Australia, Tasmania and the ACT, the Nationals have no sitting MPs and little or no organisational presence.

History

The origins of the Coalition date back to the 1922 federal election, when the Nationalist Party, the main middle-class non-Labor party of the time, lost the absolute majority it had held since its formation in 1917. The Nationalists could only stay in office with the support of the two-year-old Country Party. It soon became apparent that a confidence and supply agreement would not be enough to keep the Nationalists in office.

However, Country Party leader Earle Page had never trusted the Nationalist Prime Minister, Billy Hughes. Indeed, the Country Party had been formed in part due to discontent with Hughes' rural policy. Page not only let it be known that he would not serve under Hughes, but demanded Hughes' resignation before he would even consider coalition talks. Hughes resigned, and Page then entered negotiations with the new Nationalist leader, Stanley Bruce. The Country Party's terms were unusually stiff for a prospective junior partner in a Westminster system (and especially so for a relatively new party) – five seats in an 11-member cabinet, as well as the Treasurer's post and second rank in the ministry for Page. Nonetheless, Bruce agreed rather than force a new election. Since then, the leader of the Country Party, which evolved into the National Party, has ranked second in nearly all non-Labor governments, a status formalised in 1967 when the post of Deputy Prime Minister was formally created to denote Country leader John McEwen's status as the number-two man in the government.

The Nationalist–Country Coalition was reelected twice, and continued in office until its defeat in 1929.

The Country Party and the Nationalists' successor party, the United Australia Party, fought the 1931 federal election with a joint Senate ticket, though they ran separate House tickets. The UAP came up only four seats short of a majority in its own right. The Emergency Committee of South Australia, which stood for the UAP and Country Party in South Australia, joined the UAP party room, giving the UAP enough support to rule alone. However, the parties once again joined in a full Coalition government following the 1934 federal election.

After the death of Prime Minister Joseph Lyons in April 1939, Page was appointed as his successor on an interim basis, pending the new election of a new UAP leader. Despite Page's misgivings, the UAP elected Robert Menzies – who was known to dislike the Country Party. Page subsequently made a vitriolic speech in parliament attacking Menzies's character, and withdrew his party from the coalition – the most recent occasion on which the coalition has been broken while in government. However, a number of Page's colleagues disagreed with his stance, and he resigned as leader in September 1939. He was replaced by Archie Cameron, and after months of negotiations the coalition was revived in March 1940, with five Country MPs joining the second Menzies Ministry.

After losing eight seats at the 1940 federal election, the Coalition was plunged into minority government for the first time in its history. Archie Cameron was an immediate victim of the election result, being replaced by Arthur Fadden and later defecting to the UAP. Menzies increasingly struggled to balance his management of Australia's war effort with domestic concerns, and his party began to rebel against him. However, the UAP was bereft of leadership despite having been in power for a decade. With this in mind, in August 1941 the Coalition collectively decided that Fadden and Menzies should swap positions, with Menzies becoming Minister for Defence Co-ordination and Fadden becoming prime minister. It was the first and only occasion on which the Coalition was led by the leader of the junior party. However, the Fadden Government only lasted a few months before losing a confidence motion and being replaced by the Labor Party in the form of the Curtin Government.

After the demise of the Fadden Government, the Coalition voted to continue on under his leadership in opposition. Menzies had opposed this, and resigned as UAP leader, to be replaced by the ageing Billy Hughes. Up until the 1943 election, the Coalition effectively operated as a single unit, with separate party meetings being extremely rare. However, the landslide defeat it suffered – under Fadden as opposition leader – led to an immediate change in strategy. The UAP voted to break off its ties with the Country Party in opposition, and re-elected Menzies as its leader. This is the most recent occasion on which the senior partner in the Coalition has opted to withdraw.

The UAP was folded into the Liberal Party in 1945, with Menzies as leader. In the lead-up to the 1946 federal election, Menzies renewed the Coalition with the Country Party, which was still led by Fadden. They won the 1949 federal election as a Coalition, and stayed in office for a record 23 years. Since 1946, the Coalition has remained intact with two exceptions, both in opposition. The parties decided not to form a coalition opposition following their defeat in 1972, but went into the 1974 federal election as a Coalition. The Coalition remained together upon entering opposition in 1983 federal election. The Coalition suffered another break, related to the "Joh for Canberra" campaign, from April to August 1987, the rift healing after the 1987 federal election.

The solidity of the Coalition is so strong that when the Liberals won parliamentary majorities in their own right in the 1975, 1977 and 1996 federal elections, the Coalition was retained.

In the 2007 federal election, the Coalition lost to the Labor Party and went into opposition. The Coalition regained office in the 2013 federal election as a majority government. In October 2018, the Coalition went into minority government for the second time in its history, when the seat of Wentworth was won by Independent Kerryn Phelps in the by-election. The by-election was triggered by the resignation of incumbent Liberal MP Malcolm Turnbull, who was ousted as Prime Minister and Liberal Party leader during a spill motion earlier in August 2018. The coalition formed majority government again following the 2019 federal election. In the 2022 Australian federal election the Coalition lost to the Labor Party and returned to opposition.

Suggestions to merge
In March 1973, former Prime Minister William McMahon publicly announced his support for a merger. McMahon reiterated his view after Labor won the 1974 election, and Billy Snedden, his successor as leader of the Liberal Party, also stated that he favoured a merger.

During the 1980s, former Nationals MP Peter Nixon reviewed the party and "concluded it should seriously consider amalgamating with the Liberals". Former Nationals leader Doug Anthony wrote not long afterward, "Any objective and rational National Party member who read this report would have to accept that amalgamation was the only realistic course. Regrettably, there are still too many who don't want to read it and who don't want to face reality, that the role of a specialist party looking after the needs of rural people is in decline." Nationals leader Ian Sinclair publicly rejected calls for a merger, citing the incompatibility of the National Party's conservatism and the "small-l liberal" wing of the Liberal Party.

In July 1989, Senator Fred Chaney, the deputy leader of the Liberal Party, stated his tentative support for a merger, but noted that it could not be led by politicians and should come from the grassroots.

In the wake of their 2007 federal election loss, there was again talk of a merger in 2007 and 2008, as a result of a shrinking National Party vote. It was argued that the decline in the National vote is linked to a declining rural population, and National Party policies have become increasingly similar to those of the Liberal Party. However no merger took place outside of Queensland.

Electoral organisation
Coalition arrangements are facilitated by Australia's preferential voting systems which enable Liberals and Nationals to compete locally in "three-cornered-contests", with the Australian Labor Party (ALP), while exchanging preferences in elections. Such contests would weaken their prospects under first-past-the-post voting. From time to time, friction is caused by the fact that the Liberal and National candidates are campaigning against each other, without long-term damage to the relationship.

Indeed, the whole point of introducing preferential voting was to allow safe spoiler-free, three-cornered contests. It was a government of the Nationalist Party, a forerunner to the modern Liberal Party which introduced the legislation, following Labor's unexpected win at the 1918 Swan by-election where the conservative vote split. Two months later, the Corangamite by-election held under preferential voting caused the initially leading ALP candidate to lose after some lower-placed candidates' preferences had been distributed.

As a result of variations on the preferential voting system used in every state and territory, the Coalition has been able to thrive, wherever both its member parties have both been active. The preferential voting system has allowed the Liberal and National parties to compete and co-operate at the same time. By contrast, a variation of the preferential system known as optional preferential voting has proven a significant handicap to coalition co-operation in Queensland and New South Wales, because significant numbers of voters do not express all useful preferences.

Nomenclature
Due to a disciplined coalition between the parties and their predecessors being in existence for almost 100 years with only a few brief cessations within a parliamentary system, most commentators and the general public often refer to the Coalition as if it were a single party. Polling and electoral results contain a two-party-preferred (TPP) vote which is based on Labor and the Coalition. The Australian Electoral Commission has distinguished between "traditional" (Coalition/Labor) two-party-preferred (TPP/2PP) contests, and "non-traditional" (Independent, Greens, Liberal vs National) two-candidate-preferred (TCP/2CP) contests. At the 2010 federal election, all eight seats which resulted in a two-candidate-preferred result were re-counted to also express a statistical-only "traditional" two-party-preferred result.

Chronology

Federal election results

House of Representatives

States and territories

New South Wales
A Coalition between the Liberal (and predecessors) and National parties has existed without interruption in New South Wales since 1927.  Predecessors of the NSW Liberal Party, including the UAP, Nationalist Party and the Democratic Party, maintained a coalition with the Country Party (old name of National Party).

The Liberal Party is led by Dominic Perrottet and the National Party by Paul Toole. The Coalition won the 2011 state election in a massive swing under Barry O'Farrell, the 2015 election with a reduced majority under Mike Baird, and the 2019 election under Gladys Berejiklian.

New South Wales is the only state where the non-Labor Coalition has never broken, and yet has also never merged. This remained the case even in 2011, when the Liberals won a majority in their own right but still retained the Coalition. On 10 September 2020, the Nationals threatened to move to the crossbench over a dispute regarding koala protection laws, but the issue was resolved the next day and the Nationals remained in the Coalition.

Queensland
Due to Brisbane having a much smaller share of Queensland's population compared to the other state capitals, Queensland is the only state in which the Nationals have consistently been the stronger non-Labor party.  The Nationals were the senior partner in the non-Labor Coalition from 1925 until the Coalition was broken in 1983. At an election held two months later, the Nationals under Joh Bjelke-Petersen came up one seat short of a majority, but later gained a majority when two Liberal MLAs crossed the floor to join the Nationals. The Nationals then governed in their own right until 1989. The Coalition was renewed in 1991, and won power under Rob Borbidge from 1996 to 1998.

The Queensland Liberals and Nationals had contested separately for the Senate in federal elections until the 2007 election, when they ran a join Senate ticket for the first time in 30 years. In 2008, the two parties agreed to merge, forming the Liberal National Party (LNP), under the leadership of former National Lawrence Springborg.  Although it is dominated by former Nationals, it has full voting rights within the Liberal Party and observer status within the National Party. Springborg stood down in 2009, and was succeeded by former Liberal John-Paul Langbroek.  The LNP won an overwhelming majority government in the 2012 state election under the leadership of former Liberal Campbell Newman, who had taken over from Langbroek a year earlier.  However, it lost power in 2015, and Springborg returned to the leadership, only to lose a challenge by former Liberal Tim Nicholls in May 2016. Following another loss in the 2017 election, Nicholls stood down as LNP party leader and was succeeded by Deb Frecklington, who holds the ancestrally National seat of Nanango, Bjelke-Petersen's old seat.

At the federal level, 15 LNP MPs sit with the Liberals, including federal Liberal leader Peter Dutton; six sit with the Nationals, including federal Nationals leader David Littleproud. LNP Senator Matt Canavan sits with the Nationals, while the LNP's four other senators sit with the Liberals. The highest-profile LNP MP in recent years has been former federal Nationals leader and Deputy Prime Minister Warren Truss.  The LNP has an informal agreement with its federal counterparts as to which party room in which LNP members will sit. Incumbent MPs retain their previous federal affiliations, whereas members who win seats from the ALP that previously belonged to the Coalition will sit with the previous member's party. An amicable division of seats was decided upon for new seats or seats that have never been won by the Coalition.  In practice, all LNP MPs from Brisbane and most LNP MPs from the Gold Coast and the Sunshine Coast sit with the Liberals, while those from rural seats usually sit with the Nationals.

South Australia
The state branch of the Country Party merged with the Liberal Federation, the state branch of the UAP, in 1932 to form the Liberal and Country League. It later became the state division of the Liberal Party when the latter was formed in 1945. A separate Country Party (later Nationals SA) was revived in 1963, though the main non-Labor party in South Australia continued to use the LCL name until it was also renamed to the Liberal Party in 1974. The revived SA Nationals have never been successful in South Australia, due to the state's highly centralised population (some three-quarters of the population lives in Adelaide) and the Liberals' strong support in rural areas that would tilt National in most of the rest of Australia. The party's current incarnation has only elected two representatives: Peter Blacker from 1973 to 1993, and Karlene Maywald from 1997 to 2010.

From 2004 to 2010, Maywald was a Minister in the Rann Labor Government, before losing her seat at the 2010 South Australian state election, thereby informally creating a Labor-National coalition in South Australia. The National Party, at the time, rejected the notion that it was in a coalition with Labor at the state level. State National Party President John Venus told journalists, "We (The Nationals) are not in coalition with the Labor Party, we aren't in coalition with the Liberals, we are definitely not in coalition with anyone. We stand alone in South Australia as an independent party." Flinders University political scientist Haydon Manning disagreed, saying that it is "churlish to describe the government as anything but a coalition". The party did not run candidates at the 2010 federal election, but ran one candidate in the seat of Barker and two for the Senate at the 2013 election. The Nationals candidate for Barker and several other Coalition figures assured electors that any Nationals elected from South Australia would be part of the Coalition, after comments from the Liberal candidate to the contrary.

Tasmania
The National Party has never done well in Tasmania, even though its first leader, William McWilliams, was a Tasmanian. It has elected only two other lower house members. A Tasmania branch of the then-Country Party was formed in 1922 and briefly held the balance of power, but merged with the Nationalists in 1924.  It was refounded in 1962, but never gained much ground.  In 1969, Liberal MHA Kevin Lyons, the son of former Prime Minister Lyons, pulled together most of the Tasmanian Country Party into the Centre Party, which held the balance of power in that year's state election. It threw its support to the Liberals, and Lyons – the Centre Party's lone MHA – became Deputy Premier.  The Liberal-Centre alliance fell apart in 1972, forcing an early election.  In 1975, what remained of the Centre Party became the Tasmanian chapter of what was by now the National Country Party before fading away completely.  A Tasmanian National Party branch was briefly revived in the 1990s before it too disappeared, leaving the Liberal Party as the sole major non-Labor party in the state. In 2018, Senator Steve Martin, formerly of the Jacqui Lambie Network, joined the Nationals, becoming the party's first federal member from Tasmania in either chamber in 90 years. However, Martin lost his bid for a new term.

Victoria

A Coalition between the Liberal and National parties exists in Victoria. The Liberal Party is led by John Pesutto and the National Party by Peter Walsh.

The Country Party was the stronger coalition partner on multiple occasions from the 1920s through to the 1950s, and Country leaders served as Premier of Victoria on five separate occasions. However, the relationship between the two parties was somewhat strained for most of the second half of the 20th century. In 1948, the coalition was broken when the Liberal leader and Premier Thomas Hollway sacked Country leader John McDonald as Deputy Premier. In March 1949, the Liberals renamed themselves the Liberal and Country Party as part of an effort to merge the two non-Labor parties in Victoria. However, McDonald saw this as an attempted Liberal takeover of the Country Party, and the Country Party turned the proposed merger down. As a result, both parties competed against each other and fought elections separately from 1952 to 1989. The presence of John McEwen, a Victorian, as number-two man in the federal government from 1958 to 1971 (including a brief stint as interim Prime Minister) did little to change this.

The Liberals and Nationals reached a Coalition agreement in 1990. They fought and won the 1992 and 1996 elections as a Coalition under the leadership of Jeff Kennett. Although the Liberals won enough seats to govern alone, Kennett retained the Nationals in his government. When Peter Ryan became leader of the Nationals shortly after the Kennett government's 1999 election defeat, he terminated the Coalition agreement and led the Nationals into the 2002 and 2006 elections separately from the Liberals. However, the Coalition agreement was renewed in 2008 and the Victorian Liberal and National parties went into the 2010 election as a Coalition. The Coalition ended up winning the 2010 election with a one-seat margin under the leadership of Ted Baillieu, who resigned in 2013 and was succeeded by Denis Napthine. The Coalition lost power at the 2014 election. The Coalition arrangement was maintained while the two parties were in opposition.

According to The Age, between November 2018 and November 2021, the Coalition's Legislative Council members voted with the Andrews Government's position 28.9% of the time; of the parties in the Legislative Council, only the Liberal Democratic Party had a lower figure (22.1%).

Western Australia

The Country Party was the stronger coalition partner from the 1933 state election to the 1947 state election, although the Coalition did not form government during this period. Western Australia has never had a premier from the Country/National Party.

In May 1949, the Liberal and Country League (Western Australia) was formed to attempt to merge Country Party (then called County Democratic League or CDL) and Liberal Party together. This did not eventuate and the CDL did not join the new party.

The National Party was in Coalition with the Liberal Party government from 1993 to 2001 (see Hendy Cowan), but the Coalition was subsequently broken. In 2008, the Liberals under Colin Barnett, the Nationals under Brendon Grylls, and independent John Bowler formed a minority government after the 2008 election. However, it was not characterised as a "traditional coalition", with limited cabinet collective responsibility for National cabinet members. Tony Crook was elected as the WA Nationals candidate for the seat of O'Connor at the 2010 federal election. Although some reports initially counted Crook as a National MP, and thus part of the Coalition, Crook sat as a crossbencher.

The Liberals won enough seats for a majority in their own right in the 2013 state election, but Barnett had announced before the election that he would retain the coalition with the Nationals. However, Barnett would have likely had to keep the Nationals in his government in any event. According to the ABC's Antony Green, the rural weighting in the Legislative Council all but forces the WA Liberals to depend on National support even when the Liberals have enough support to govern alone. The Barnett government was heavily defeated at the 2017 state election, and the two parties went their separate ways with Liberal Party being the sole opposition party.

In the 2021 election, the Liberal Party ended up winning fewer seats than the National Party, headed by Mia Davies, with the National Party gaining opposition status and Davies becoming the first Nationals opposition leader since 1947. Following the election, the Liberal Party and Nationals Party entered into a formal alliance to form opposition, with National Party being the senior party and the Liberal Party being the junior party in the alliance. Shadow ministerial positions were also held by parliamentary members of both parties. This was similar to the agreements between both parties when they were in government following the 2008 and 2013 elections. Similar to the 2008 and 2013 agreements, the deputy leader of the senior party, Nationals deputy leader Shane Love, was the deputy opposition leader, instead of the leader of the junior party, Liberal Party leader David Honey. Under the alliance, each party maintained their independence, and could speak out on issues when there was a disagreement with their partner.

Territories
Australian Capital Territory: The National Party is not affiliated in the Australian Capital Territory, leaving the Liberal Party as the sole major non-Labor party in the territory.
Northern Territory: The two parties' branches in the Northern Territory merged in 1974, forming the Country Liberal Party. The CLP governed the Territory from 1974 to 2001 and from 2012 to 2016. The CLP retains full voting rights within the federal National Party, and has observer status with the federal Liberal Party. The CLP directs its federal members of the House and Senate whether to sit with the federal Liberals or Nationals. In practice, since the mid-1980s, CLP House members have sat with the Liberals while CLP Senators sit with the Nationals. For example, Natasha Griggs sat with the Liberals when she held the Darwin-area seat of Solomon from 2010 to 2016. CLP Senator Nigel Scullion was the leader of the Nationals in the Senate from 2007 to 2008, when he was succeeded by Barnaby Joyce.  He was the federal deputy leader of the Nationals, alongside Truss, from 2007 to 2013. Joyce became federal Nationals deputy leader after his successful transition to the House of Representatives at the 2013 election, and Scullion returned as the Nationals Senate leader.

See also
 Two-party system

Notes

References
 

Political party alliances in Australia
Conservatism in Australia
Liberalism in Australia
Liberal Party of Australia
National Party of Australia